Laboratory News is a monthly science magazine aimed at scientists with a focus on laboratory equipment. Founded in 1971, the magazine covers all aspects of scientific discovery and advances in the laboratory sector. Laboratory News has two websites associated with the publication which contains news, features, comments, new products for the laboratory industry, and events; and allows users to search for products and services relevant to the laboratory industry.

Regular content
 News - Highlights from the past month in science;
 Editorial comment - Personal insights into developments and trends;
 The Big Ask - a Q&A session with the people behind the science;
 Laboratology - lighthearted insight into research
 Lab Babble - comment from regular columnist; 
 Features - Indepth articles on new methods, techniques, equipment and trends;
 Science Allsorts - competitions, lighthearted look at things to do, read and see;
 Products - A directory of new products for the laboratory industry;
 Classified - Advertisements for products and services;
 Competitions - Including a crossword and sudoku;
 Game Theory - A review of a science board or card game

External links
labnews.co.uk
laboratorytalk.com
synthesismedia.co.uk

1971 establishments in the United Kingdom
Magazines established in 1971
Magazines published in London
Monthly magazines published in the United Kingdom
Science and technology magazines published in the United Kingdom